Adventures in the Sin Bin is a 2012 American adventure comedy-drama film written by Christopher Storer, directed by Billy Federighi and starring Michael Seater, Bo Burnham, Gillian Jacobs, Tim Blake Nelson, Emily Meade and Jeff Garlin.

Cast
Michael Seater as Brian
Emily Meade as Suzie
Bo Burnham as Tony
Brian Petsos as Benny
Gillian Jacobs as Lauren
Ben McKenzie as Michael
Jeff Garlin as Dean Theatard
Tim Blake Nelson as Totsch

Release
In June 2013, it was announced that Phase 4 Films acquired U.S. and Canadian distribution rights to the film, which premiered at the Seattle International Film Festival in 2012.  The film was released in theaters and on demand on October 18, 2013.

Reception
The Hollywood Reporter gave the film a positive review, calling it "Heavily dependent on Wes Anderson's aesthetic but charming nonetheless."

References

External links